NSHS as an acronym can refer to many High Schools:
North Salem High School - Salem, Oregon
North Stafford High School - Stafford, Virginia
New School High School - Monmouth County, New Jersey
Newman Smith High School - Carrollton, Texas
North Scott High School - Eldridge, Iowa
Newton South High School - Newton, Massachusetts
North Springs High School - Sandy Springs, Georgia
North Shore High School - Glen Head, New York
North Shore High School - Harris County, Texas
New Salem High School - North Dakota
Ninety Six High School - Ninety-Six, South Carolina
North Sanpete High School - Mt. Pleasant, Utah
North Stanly High School - Stanly County, North Carolina
North Surry High School - Mount Airy, North Carolina
Nanuet Senior High School - Nanuet, New York